The PEN/Ralph Manheim Medal  for Translation, named in honor of U.S. translator Ralph Manheim, is a literary award given every three years by PEN America (the U.S. chapter of International PEN) to a translator "whose career has demonstrated a commitment to excellence through the body of his or her work". The Medal is awarded in recognition of a lifetime's achievements in the field of literary translation.

It was first presented in 1982, to Gregory Rabassa, who has translated works by Gabriel García Márquez, Mario Vargas Llosa, and other Latin American literary giants. The next award will be announced in 2024.

The medal is one of many PEN awards sponsored by International PEN affiliates in over 145 PEN centers around the world. The PEN American Center awards have been characterized as being among the "major" American literary prizes. The PEN/Ralph Manheim Medal was called one of "the most prominent translation awards."

Honorees

References

External links
PEN/Ralph Manheim Medal for Translation (PEN America)

Translation awards
Literary awards honoring lifetime achievement
PEN America awards
Awards established in 1982
1982 establishments in the United States